Sioux City Community School District (SCCSD) is a public school district headquartered in the Educational Service Center in Sioux City, Iowa. The district is mostly in Woodbury County, with a portion in Plymouth County.

Schools
 High schools
 East High School
 North High School
 West High School

 Middle schools
 East Middle School
 North Middle School 
 West Middle School

 Elementary schools
 Bryant
 Hunt A+ Arts
 Irving Dual Language
 Leeds
 Liberty
 Loess Hills Computer Programming
 Morningside STEM
 Nodland/Sunnyside
 Perry Creek
 Riverside
 Spalding Park Environmental Sciences
 Unity

 Preschools
 Clark Early Childhood Center

References

External links
 Sioux City Community School District
School districts in Iowa
Education in Sioux City, Iowa
Education in Woodbury County, Iowa
Education in Plymouth County, Iowa